Cisów-Orłowiny Landscape Park (Cisowsko-Orłowiński Park Krajobrazowy) is a protected area (Landscape Park) in south-central Poland, covering an area of .

The Park lies within Świętokrzyskie Voivodeship, in Kielce County (Gmina Bieliny, Gmina Daleszyce, Gmina Górno, Gmina Łagów, Gmina Pierzchnica, Gmina Raków).

Within the Landscape Park are four nature reserves.

In the park, in the "Zamczysko" forest reserve, there is a pagan sanctuary with earth embankments and terraces.

References 

Landscape parks in Poland
Parks in Świętokrzyskie Voivodeship